Spiridon Reveliotis is an engineer at the Georgia Institute of Technology in Atlanta. He was named a Fellow of the Institute of Electrical and Electronics Engineers (IEEE) in 2015 for his contributions to discrete event systems for resource allocation.

References 

Fellow Members of the IEEE
Living people
Georgia Tech faculty
University of Illinois alumni
Northeastern University alumni
Year of birth missing (living people)
American electrical engineers